Nikolay Markov (born June 9, 1960) is a retired Bulgarian sprinter who specialized in the 200 metres.

At the 1982 European Championships he finished eighth in the 4 x 100 metres relay together with Ivaylo Karanyotov, Petar Petrov and Ivan Tuparov. He became Bulgarian 200 metres champion in 1986, and also won the 1986 Balkan Championships.

References

1960 births
Living people
Bulgarian male sprinters